Nacer Zekri (born 3 August 1971) is an Algerian footballer. He played in 19 matches for the Algeria national football team from 1990 to 1996. He was also named in Algeria's squad for the 1996 African Cup of Nations tournament.

References

External links
 

1971 births
Living people
Algerian footballers
Algeria international footballers
1996 African Cup of Nations players
Place of birth missing (living people)
Association footballers not categorized by position
21st-century Algerian people